Xi Psi Phi  International Dental Fraternity  is an international professional fraternity for dentistry. It was founded on February 8, 1889. Xi Psi Phi was the second professional dental fraternity to be formed, following Delta Sigma Delta (1882) and pre-dating Psi Omega (1892) and Alpha Omega (1907).

History
Xi Psi Phi was organized on February 8, 1889 at the University of Michigan by Arthur A. Deyoe, Lewis C. Thayer, William F. Gary, Walter H. Booth, Gordon C. McCoy and Eldon Waterloo. In addition, Fifteen others are counted as associate founders. The fraternity was incorporated on February 6, 1906 in the State of Illinois.

Originally five freshman dental students at the University of Michigan at Ann Arbor felt the need to create a club among freshman dental students for intellectual and social interaction. They decided to organize a “dental brothers guild,” first named Delta Beta Gamma. During the winter of 1888, the five freshman students (Walter H. Booth, Arthur A. Deyoe, Gordon C. McCoy, Lewis C. Thayer and Eldon Waterloo) and one junior student (William F. Gray) prepared to start such a club.

In order to complete the organization details before the close of the school year, they had admitted to membership a few students whose qualifications were not of a high standard. Lewis C. Thayer became the first president and the offices of vice president, secretary and treasurer were held by George C. Thuerer, William F. Gray and Charles E. Collamer, respectively.

When announcement of becoming a national Fraternity was made, inquiries with regard to charters came from students in dental schools from all across the country. The first charters then issued by Alpha chapter were to Beta chapter at New York College of Dental Surgery; Delta chapter at Baltimore College of Dental Surgery; Epsilon chapter at University of Iowa College of Dentistry; Eta chapter, University of Maryland School of Dentistry; and Theta chapter at Indiana University School of Dentistry. During the next eleven years, 15 subordinate collegiate chapters were formed.

Publications and Governance Structure
In 1899, the first issue of the Xi Psi Phi Quarterly magazine was published with Marvin J. Houghton, Alpha ’00, as editor-in-chief. C.C. Markey, Alpha ’00, and E. M. Brown, Alpha ’00, served as associate editors. An editorial in the March 1900 issue of the Quarterly stated: “The remarkable growth of the Fraternity since its organization, its constantly increasing membership, the interest elicited by members young and old, have rendered the time ripe for a national convention. The time is past when Alpha chapter should be recognized head of the Fraternity; the work has gone beyond the range of a few men located in the one college. Alpha wishes to share with all and all alike, the honors of the Fraternity.”

At the subsequent first national convention on  the Supreme Chapter was organized with delegates from most of the subordinate chapters present. Guy S. Millberry, Iota ’00, was elected to serve as the first Supreme President.

On , the original Constitution, written in 1899 by Frank P. Watson, was rewritten giving the composition of the Fraternity as a “Supreme Chapter, Supreme Council, Greek Letter Chapters and Alumni Association.” In addition, a Fraternity crest was adopted, the red rose was selected as the Fraternity flower, and the motto and the Fraternity colors of lavender and cream were approved at that time.

On , a petition for incorporation was granted by the State of Illinois and a Board of Directors was created to supplement the Supreme Council.

In , the National Alumni Chapter was organized.

Recent History
In 1963 a new Honorary Membership category was created. The 1972 Supreme Chapter Assembly eliminated the requirement that all members be male, thus permitting the initiation of female students and dentists.

The Fraternity continues to publish its quarterly journal, Xi Psi Phi, recent issues available here.

Traditions
The insignia of the Xi Psi Phi fraternity is a four-leaf gold pin, with three pearls set in each leaf, surmounted by a diamond shaped black-enamel piece bearing the Greek Letters .  The colors are lavender and cream.

Fraternity members are called "Zips" as a popular nickname.

Chapters

The Society has established 63 chapters since . Of these, 19 are active.

See also

 Delta Sigma Delta
 Psi Omega
 Alpha Omega
 Omicron Kappa Upsilon
 Sigma Phi Alpha
 List of dental schools in the United States
 List of defunct dental schools in the United States

References

External links

Recent edition  of the Xi Psi Phi Quarterly

 
Student organizations established in 1889
Professional dental fraternities and sororities in the United States
Former members of Professional Fraternity Association
1889 establishments in Michigan